Dargai railway station is located in town of Dargai in Malakand District, Khyber Pakhtunkhwa province, Pakistan. The station is the last station on Nowshera–Dargai Branch Line. The station was closed in 2002 and Railway land was leased to avoid unauthorized occupation and encroachments. There is rare freight movement.

See also
 List of railway stations in Pakistan
 Pakistan Railways

References

Railway stations in Malakand District
Railway stations opened in 1886
Defunct railway stations in Pakistan
Railway stations on Nowshera–Dargai Railway Line